The following is a list of television programs formerly or currently broadcast by Arirang TV.

#
#KOREA 4.0 - current
#Stylecast - past
#Stylecast 2017 - past
100 Icons of Korean Culture - past
21st Century - past
1DAY 1FILM K-CINEFLEX - current
The 3S - past
4 Angles - past

A

B

C

D

E

F

G

H

I

J

K

L

M

N

O

P

Q

R

S

T

U

V

W

X

Y

Arirang TV
Arirang